Mohammad Shah (born Mohammad Mirza; 5 January 1808 – 5 September 1848) was the third Qajar shah of Iran from 1834 to 1848, having succeeded his grandfather Fath-Ali Shah. From a young age, Mohammad Mirza was under the tutelage of Haji Mirza Aqasi, a local dervish from Tabriz whose teachings influenced the young prince to become a Sufi-king later in his life. After his father Abbas Mirza died in 1833, Mohammad Mirza became the Crown Prince of Iran and was conferred the title of Governor of Azarbaijan. Not long after, Fath-Ali Shah died on his way to Shiraz, leading some of his sons—including Ali Shah Mirza and Hossein Ali Mirza—to revolt but Mohammad Shah, with the support of his grand vizier, Abol-Qasem Qa'em-Maqam, suppressed the rebellions and asserted his authority.

Mohammad Shah ordered the removal, imprisonment and eventual execution of Qa'em-Maqam, which led to appointment of Aqasi as the grand vizier. One of Mohammad Shah's main goals was to reconquer the rebellious city of Herat and return it to Iranian sovereignty. In 1837, when he had asserted his authority, he marched to Herat and laid a futile siege on the city but was forced to withdraw when the British government threatened military action. On his return to Iran, Mohammad suppressed a revolt in Isfahan led by major clergy figure Mohammad Bagher Shafti. In 1837, the Governor of Baghdad sacked the city of Khorramshahr. Mohammad Shah intended to declare war with the Ottoman Empire but the British-Russian mediation prevented escalation of tensions and war, and led to the signing of the Second Treaty of Erzurum.

Under pressure from the UK, Mohammad Shah abolished the slave trade through the Persian Gulf but it was still allowed to have slaves and trade them over land. Mohammad initially opposed the abolition citing Islamic tradition but eventually accepted. Another important event of his time was the rise of the Báb and Bábism, in which Mohammad refused to kill his followers despite a fatwa imposed by Shiite clerics. France–Iran relations resumed during his reign. Mohammad suffered from gout, which overshadowed his reign, in the final years of which, his physical health deteriorated, and he died from a combination of gout and erysipelas on 4 September 1848 at the age of 40 and after fourteen years of rule. He was buried in Fatima Masumeh Shrine in Qom and was succeeded by his son, Naser al-Din Shah.

As a ruler, Mohammad Shah did not receive praise. He was labeled as a figurehead king for Aqasi, whom he was highly dependent on. Mohammad was devoted to both Aqasi and his teachings on Sufism; he became a willing sustainer of Sufis, and sought spiritual guidance in mystical rituals instead of the marji'i taqlīd. The ulama grew as his firmest rivals, who challenged his legitimacy and authority throughout his short reign. Mohammad enlarged the Qajar bureaucracy, and filled governmental positions with Aqasi's Sufi friends and companions, thus establishing a corrupt administration that saw its peak during his son's reign. Mohammad Shah was the last Qajar king who attended the battlefield in a foreign war, and was also the last to use the title Ghazi (warrior of Islam) for his presence in the Iran-Russia war and for suppressing the rebellion in Isfahan.

Background 
When Agha Mohammad Khan, the founder of the Qajar dynasty, was conquering the eastern provinces of Iran in 1795, the Russian Empire invaded the Caucasus, and the Shah was forced to move his army there without consolidating his rule in the east, including in Herat. The Russian army retreated before he could reach the Caucasus, and, Agha Mohammad was assassinated in 1797 in Shusha. Though his realm never reached the far east of Greater Khorasan, he was recognised as the Shahanshah by Ahmad Shah Durrani, who proclaimed his allegiance in a public khutba. Agha Mohammad Khan was succeeded by his nephew, Fath-Ali Shah (Then called Baba Khan). During the reign of Fath-Ali Shah, disputes between Iran and Russia over sovereignty over Georgia led to wars that resulted in the defeat of Iran in several stages; According to the Gulistan and Turkmenchay treaties, large parts of the realm were separated and Iran was forced to make many concessions to Russia. The war also tarnished Iran's global image to a weak state with unstable borders, and overshadowed Iranian pride.

In Europe, British Empire, gained sovereignty over India and viewed Iran as a strong barrier to prevent Russia from gaining access to the region. On the other hand, it was well known that the Russian Empire, in its quest to reach the warm open waters in southern Iran, intended to expand its sovereignty over Iranian territory. Thus, during the reign of Fath-Ali Shah, the Iranian political stage was a competition between the Russian and British governments to receive numerous concessions and expand political influence.

In the years between the two wars with Russia, various issues led to a war between Iran and the Ottoman Empire in 1821, which ended with the military victory of Iran and the conclusion of the First Treaty of Erzurum in 1823. The treaty did not resolve fundamental differences, the most important of which was the delimitation of the two states, and left it vague. There were also disputes such as the persecution of Iranian pilgrims to Shiite holy sites by the Ottomans and the citizenship of border tribes. Another contentious issue was the trade rivalry between Khorramshahr and Basra.

From the beginning of his reign, Fath-Ali Shah tried to present himself as a pious king in the eyes of Shiite clerics and went so far as to declare his monarchy a subrogation for the ulama. During his reign, Isfahan once again took on the image of the religious capital of Iran, and the government left the hands of Shiite clerics free to persecute religious minorities. Sufis suffered the most. Fath-Ali Shah took upon himself to lead their persecution; In such ways like ordering to "suffocate" the Sufi leaders of Tabriz.

Early life

Childhood 

Mohammad Mirza was born on 5 January 1808 in Tabriz. He was the eldest son of Crown prince Abbas Mirza and Glin Khanum, daughter of Mirza Mohammad Khan Qajar Davallu. During his childhood and youth, Mohammad Mirza was a "quiet" and "shy" boy with no apparent political ambitions. He completed his traditional princely education in Tabriz and became a skilled calligrapher and painter, and learned painting under Robert Ker Porter. His level of knowledge, however, was limited compared to that of his brothers, especially Djahangir Mirza and Farhad Mirza, who excelled in writing and other "branches of science". An important moment of his life was when Mirza Bozorg Qa'em-Maqam, the majordomo of Abbas Mirza, summoned the dervish Haji Mirza Aqasi to his father's household. By Mirza Bozorg's orders, Aqasi was appointed the chief tutor to Mohammad, who quickly became devoted to Aqasi and his Sufi teachings. Abol-Qasem Qa'em-Maqam, another of Mohammad's tutors, tried to dissuade Mohammad from studying under Aqasi but Aqasi's influence on Mohammad increased.

When Mohammad Mirza was 12 years old, Fath-Ali Shah summoned him from Tabriz to Tehran to marry Malek Jahan Khanom, the daughter of Mohammad Qasim Khan Zahir al-Dawla, to establish solidarity between the royal family and the Davallu cadet branch of the Qajar dynasty. The marriage, which took place in September 1819, was loveless. As a result of recurring deaths of their infants, Mohammad Mirza developed resentment towards Malek Jahan. Of their children, only Naser al-Din Mirza, who later became the crown prince and then king of Iran; and Ezzat ed-Dowleh, who married Amir Kabir, later the chief minister of Naser al-Din Shah; survived into adulthood.

Early military career 

The Second Russo-Iranian War began with the declaration of jihad by Shiite scholars. During the war, Abbas Mirza sent Mohammad Mirza with an army consisting of the tribes of Khajevandi and Abdul Maliki to protect the fortress of Ganja. There, with the command of Amir Khan Sardar—Abbas Mirza's maternal uncle—Mohammad launched an attack on the Russian army. In the resulting battle, Amir Khan was killed and Mohammad was severely defeated and forced to retreat; he, however, was praised for his efforts during the war and was nicknamed as Gazi (warrior of Islam). After the war, Fath Ali Shah appointed Abbas Mirza to rule Khorasan and regulate the security of that area, which experienced constant raids by Prince Kamran, whom the Iranian government had previously appointed as the governor of Herat and now styled himself "Shah". Mohammad Mirza also accompanied his father on this trip. In one of his missions, Mohammad released nearly 20,000 Iranians held captive by Central Asian Sunni tribes; in honor of this victory, he named his newborn child "Naser al-Din" (defender of the faith).

Abbas Mirza spent two years in Khorasan suppressing rebel khans; Khiva and Herat supported these revolts, and promised aid but Mohammad's victories discouraged them. In 1832, Abbas Mirza summoned Kamran Shah, the ruler of Herat, to pay tribute but Kamran sent his vizier Yar Mohammad Khan. Feeling insulted, Abbas Mirza sent Mohammad Mirza with an army to Herat. Mohammad Mirza advanced directly to Herat and began preparing for a siege while Abbas MIrza was bringing him an army of reinforcement when he suddenly died in Mashhad. Upon hearing of his death, Mohammad Mirza and Abol-Qasem Qa'em-Maqam, who was also a leading figure in the siege, were forced to negotiate with Kamran. It was agreed Kamran would accept the sovereignty of Iran, pay 15,000 tomans in gold and fifty Kashmir shawls, and release the Iranian prisoners who had been captured during the war. Mohammad appointed his brother Ghahreman Mirza the governor of Khorasan and, with Qa'em-Maqam, went to Tehran to claim the title of crown prince.

Accession 

At Nowruz (Iranian New Year, which was held at the March equinox) of 1834, Mohammad Mirza was appointed as crown prince and took the governorship of Azarbaijan—the office of his father—and left Tehran for Tabriz. As crown prince, Mohammad Mirza was under the complete influence of Qa'em-Maqam, on whose orders, Mohammad imprisoned four of his brothers, including Djahangir Mirza and Khosrow Mirza, in Ardabil and later blinded them to invalidate their claims to the throne. The appointment of Mohammad as the crown prince angered Fath-ali Shah's fifth son Hossein Ali Mirza, the Prince-Governor of Fars, who thought the appointment would deprive him of his rights and was a sign of submission to Russian demands.

In October 1834, Fath-Ali Shah, with the intention of collecting 200,000 tomans tax arrears from Hossein Ali Mirza and a hidden motive to revoke him of his lands, went to Fars but died en route at Isfahan. Couriers were quickly sent to Tabriz but otherwise, the shah's death remained secret. His body was then taken to Fatima Masumeh Shrine for burial; only then the death it was publicly announced. As expected, his death sparked riots across the country, and a number of princes, including Hossein Ali Mirza in Shiraz and Ali Shah Mirza in Tehran, proclaimed themselves kings.

In early November, John Campbell and Comte Ivan Simonich, British and Russian envoys respectively, arrived in Tabriz to proclaim their support for Mohammad Mirza. They provided him an army led by Col. Henry Lindsay Bethune that set off for Tehran, where Ali Shah Mirza had proclaimed himself king. Mohammad's army met the 15,000 Ali Shah's men, who were led by Ali's brother Imam Verdi Mirza, in Takestan, west of Qazvin. After a brief confrontation, Imam Verdi Mirza sought to surrender and recognize Mohammad. The new king agreed to waive his uncles' punishment. In early 1835, Mohammad entered the capital with Qa'em-Maqam, his courtiers and Russian and British ambassadors, and was crowned king on 14 January.

In February 1835, Mohammad sent an army under command of Manouchehr Khan Gorji to liberate Isfahan from Hossein Ali Mirza's forces, who were under the command of his brother Shoja al-Saltanah. After reconquering Isfahan, Manouchehr Khan marched to Shiraz, where he captured Hossein Ali Mirza and ended his rebellion. Hossein Ali was imprisoned in Ardabil and soon died of cholera; with his defeat, the other rebel princes surrendered their claims and recognized Mohammad as the king of Iran.

Reign

Early years 

Mohammad Shah appointed Qa'em-Maqam as his grand vizier but his premiership did not last long. Qa'em-Maqam was already losing influence over Mohammad but his policies and ideas made him adversaries in the court. As soon as he became the grand vizier, Qa'em-Maqam had the royal princes swear an oath of fealty to Mohammad, otherwise he had them imprisoned, a fate that befell many Qajar princes such as Mahmud Mirza, the governor of Kashan, who refused to relinquish his claim and thus lost his title and wealth. Soon, Qa'em-Maqam was attacked by rivals, the most prominent being Allahyar Khan Asef ol-Dowleh—Mohammad Shah's uncle from the Davallu tribe—and a coalition led by Aqasi. Qa'em-Maqam's adversaries soon extended to British envoy John Campbell, who expected grand privileges for his contribution to Mohammad's enthronement but was refused by Qa'em-Maqam. To lessen British influence over the court, Qa'em-Maqam tried to improve Iran's relations with the Ottoman Empire. His rivals, with slanderous accusations, urged Mohammad to have Qa'em-Maqam ousted from his position and Mohammad was later persuaded to do so. On 22 June 1835, he arrested and imprisoned Qa'em-Maqam in Negarestan Palace and four days later, he ordered Qa'em-Maqam's execution.

Mohammad Shah then spent a few month without a grand vizier. Campbell expressed his support for Mirza Abolhassan Khan Ilchi while his courtiers supported Abdollah Amin al-Dowleh, an erstwhile grand vizier of Fath-Ali Shah, but Mohammad chose Aqasi, who filled this position for most of Mohammad's reign. By this time, Mohammad's health had become a concern for the kingdom's future and the four-year-old Naser al-Din Mirza was appointed the crown prince. Mohammad Shah granted the governorship of Azarbaijan, which the Qajar kings bestowed upon the heir apparent, to his firstborn son and appointed his brother Ghahreman Mirza as Naser al-Din's regent. Ghahreman Mirza was in close contact with the Russian government; when he died in 1839, Mohammad replaced him with his last-surviving brother Bahman Mirza.

In 1837, a rebellion broke out in Kerman; it was led by Hassan Ali Shah, better known as Agha Khan I, the leader of Nizari Ismailis The Nizari Muslims, though few in number, lived in Iran under the leadership of Hassan Ali Shah, who asserted his place by marrying Fath-Ali Shah's daughter Sarveh Jahan Khanum and acquiring the title Aga Khan. When Mohammad Shah ascended the throne, on the advise of Qa'em Maqam, he appointed Agha Khan the governor of Kerman, a rebellious state that was governed by Shoja al-Saltanah, a brother of Hossein Ali Mirza. Agha Khan pacified the state but his governorship was short-lived; in 1837, he was recalled to Tehran and was replaced with Firouz Mirza, the shah's brother. Agha Khan raised arms and declared a rebellion against the shah, and withdraw with his forces to Bam. Mohammad Shah sent an army under the command of Sourab Khan; they besieged Bam and took severely injured brother of Agha Khan prisoner. After eight months, Agha Khan surrendered and was imprisoned; his belongings were plundered and his was not allowed to receive his religious due sent from India, Khurasan and Badakhshan. Agha Khan was a prisoner of the shah until 1838, when he was allowed to retreat to his familial lands in Mahallat.

Herat campaign 

After asserting his authority, Mohammad Shah's main objective was to annex Herat. This alarmed Kamran Shah and promted him to attempt to gather neighboring tribes such as the Jamshidi, Tumani and Hazara in Herat to resist Mohammad in the event of a military campaign. These mobilizations alarmed the British government, which sent Alexander Burnes and Eldred Pottinger to Kabul and Herat respectively. Among Britain's concerns was Article 11 of the Treaty of Turkmenchay, which allowed Russia to establish consulates and trade missions with up to ten members throughout Iranian territory, implanting influence on Afghanistan and therefore becoming a threat to British India. The UK accused the Russian government of encouraging Iran to invade Herat. Iran wanted to retake of Herat partly because of Mohammad's desire to unite the Persian-speaking tribes of the Afghan highlands with Iran, and because wanted to free Iranian prisoners who were taken by Sunni tribes who lived near Khorasan. Conquest of Herat was also the first step in a plan to extend Iran's influence up to Amu Darya. In late 1836, Mohammad ordered his army to be mustered for the following spring. This gave John McNeill, the British envoy in Iran, time to arrange an agreement in which Herat would resume paying tributes. Yar Mohammad Khan, however, would not tolerate Iranian sovereignty and Kamran Shah would not withdraw unless the city was conquered.

In 1837, Mohammad Shah marched on Herat. British officers were expelled from the Iranian army and the British embassy was closed. Mohammad took personal command of Iran's 80,000 troops whereas Kamran Shah had gathered a few thousand poorly equipped soldiers. The ruler of Herat had little hope of resisting Mohammad Shah because the city's population, who had been terrorized by their overlord and dispirited by economic decline, were unlikely to put up any fight; also, the crumbling fortification of the city's walls were in poor repair and would not withstand an assault. Kamran Shah's only source of hope was the support of Sher Mohammad Khan Hazara, the Amir of Qala e Naw, who vowed a fight to death for Kamran Shah, and brought about 4,000 foot soldiers and numerous horsemen to Herat's army. Sher Mohammad Khan Hazara also organized an alliance between Aimaq, Uzbek and Turkman tribes under the banner of Sunni Islam. Thus, with the leadership of Sher Mohammad and Kamran Shah's son Nader Mirza, ten-to-twelve-thousand horsemen assembled around Qala e Naw and threatened to attack Iran's borders.

On 28 October, Mohammad Shah camped at Torbat-e Jam, where to counteract, he ordered 12,000 of his best soldiers under the command of Mohammad Khan Asef al-Dowleh, the governor of Khorasan, to march to Qala e Naw. By the middle of November, he had seized the city and its surrounds, dividing Sher Mohammad's army in two; one part was camped in Kushk under the command of Mohammad Zaman Jamshidi and the other was already retreating to Herat. The Jamshidi army faced Asef al-Dowleh's men and were scattered in a desperate fight; two-or-three-hundred men were killed and as many taken prisoner. Despite their victory, the Iranian army faced a difficult time, suffering the winter cold that reached the mountains much earlier than it reached Herat and a shortage of supplies that could only be purchased at high prices. Eventually, Asaf al-Dowleh and his men marched through the mountains to Bala Murghab and from there to Maymana, where he defeated another host of the Afghan army under the command of Sher Mohammad Khan. After this victory, Asaf al-Dowleh sent an ambassador to his opponent's camp, and promised them freedom and wealth if they surrendered to Mohammad Shah. His offer was received positively and Sher Mohammad agreed to send two of his sons to Herat to proffer their submission to Mohammad Shah.

On 23 November, Mohammad Shah with a part of his army reached the outskirts of Herat, where they faced fierce resistance from the defenders but eventually forced them to retreat behind the city walls. Mohammad Shah set up his camp south-east of Herat and began a long siege of the city. The Iranian army had a dilemma; Aqasi wanted to wait for Russian aid whereas Mirza Aqa Khan Nuri argued for crushing the city walls. Mohammad Shah faced problems feeding his men; his army quickly ran out of supplies, and the lines back to Mashhad were insecure and often impassable. The fields around Herat were already harvested by the residents and the remains had been destroyed. The problem was only solved after the spring of 1838, when Mohammad Shah ordered his men to plant their crops.

In March 1838, John McNiell arrived at Mohammad Shah's camp as the British representative; he failed to dissuade Mohammad and thus on 7 June 1838, he withdrew from Herat and ended British-Iran relations. Ten days later, the British Indian fleet from Bombay occupied Kharg Island and threatened further military actions. Under pressure to end the campaign, Mohammad Shah ordered a full-scale assault of Herat, which failed with many casualties. The British sent an ultimatum threatening war if the siege continued. The Russians abandoned Mohammad Shah's cause and withdrew their support. These, along with news of rebellions, led Mohammad Shah to give up his campaign and withdraw from the siege. Although he failed to conquer Herat, Mohammad's army still occupied Ghurian and other forts; a number of Afghan warlords such as Kohendil Khan of Kandahar would remain loyal to Mohammad Shah.

Rebellion in Isfahan 
Mohammad Bagher Shafti was one of the most distinguished religious figures of the time; with a fortune of two-and-a-half million francs. Shafti rebelled against Mohammad Shah in 1834, when he tried to seize the city Isfahan from its Prince-Governor Sayf ol-Dowleh. Over four years, Shafti took control of the city's Luti population and in 1838, he raised against the governor of the city, Gholam Hossein Khan Sepahdar, and therefore Mohammad Shah. Shafti's men, who were known for their acts of murder, robbery and rape, looted the city and took the booty to Jameh Mosque of Isfahan. There, Shafti declared their leader Ramazan as Ramazan Shah and ordered the striking of coins in his name. The roots of this revolt lay in a letter from McNiell to Shafti, in which he implied the cause of the war in Herat was the Shah's warmongering and obduracy. The rebellion was supported by a Safavid descendant called Nawab Safavi, which further encouraged the rebels to kill the city's deputy governor.

As a result, between 1838 and 1840, Isfahan was in the hands of insurgents, especially the Lutis, whose numbers were increasing because the city's poor people were joining the Lutis and Shafti's cause. To end their rebellion, Mohammad Shah went to Isfahan with 60,000 troops on the return journey from Herat. It was unprecedented for the shah to take arms against the state's clergy, especially Shafi, who was considered a clergy leader and Isfahan was regarded as the religious capital of Iran. Modern historian Homa Nategh noted this act as a "coup d'état".

Upon reaching the city, Mohammad Shah ordered the cannons to bombard Isfahan. Shafti, fearing great losses, opened the city's northern gate and the Lutis deserted from the southern gate. Mohammad Shah triumphantly entered the city and instantly ordered the execution of the remaining Lutis. He could not charge Shafti in any extreme measures but exiled his son to Astrabad. The Luti king Ramazan Shah died while under torture and of his men, 240 were killed and 400 were arrested. Mohammad Shah ordered a court to be set up so that the people could recount Lutis' crimes. Mohammad took the lands and properties Shafti and the Lutis had usurped, and made them part of his demesne lands. Harsh penalties were made to ensure stability and fear, and to prevent future rebellions. Mohammad Shah celebrated his victory greatly, trying to erase the memory of his failure in Herat. To declare Shafti's cause blasphemy, Mohammad Shah adopted the title Ghazi (the warrior of Islam), which was previously given to him for the war with the Russian empire.

The Second Treaty of Erzurum 

Hostilities with the Ottomans and tensions over the borderlands of the two empires were unresolved by the treaty of Erzurum and later led to incidents during Mohammad Shah's reign that pushed him to start a war, such as an incident caused by Ali Reza Pasha, the governor of Baghdad, who sacked the city of Khorramshahr in 1837. Thereafter, the peace over the frontier of Iran and the Ottoman Empire became a prioritized European project in the early 1840s. Negotiations between the two nations began in 1842 in Erzurum, a sizeable frontier town. The Iranian commission included Mirza Taqi Khan Farahani, later known as Amir Kabir, whose involvement in the treaty brought him to attention in political circles. On the Ottoman side was Enveri Sadullah Efendi, a member of the Supreme Council of Justice whose arrogance and occasional undiplomatic language created so many problems that he was considered to be replaced. Negotiations began on 15 May 1843; Mohammad Shah had demanded the Iranian plenipotentiaries to resolve the negotiations quickly or he would raise arms against the Ottoman Empire. Negotiations lasted for four years, mostly because of delays caused by political and military crises such as the Ottoman massacre of 22,000 Shi'i Iranian pilgrims on the road to Karbala that caused the suspension of the negotiations for three months.

Negotiations were resumed by British and Russian mediators. Territorial restitution were confined to the cities Khorramshahr, Zohab and Sulaymaniyah, and the Iranian dominance over the Shatt al-Arab. Ownership of Zohab was a heated argument between negotiators; the town, which was insignificant in itself, was captured by Mohamad Ali Mirza Dowlatshah, the firstborn son of Fath-Ali Shah, during the Ottoman-Persian war of 1821 and Iran retained sovereignty although in the First Treaty of Erzurum, Iran had agreed to return it. At first, Iran tried to keep the town because Farahani suggested Zohab be divided between the two nations but the Iranian party later agreed to return sovereignty of the town to the Ottomans who, in return, would forsake their desire to dominant the Shatt al-Arab's trade route. When the commissioners began discussing Khorramshahr, Farahani declared the town has always been part of Khuzistan and demanded £1 million in compensation for the 1837 sacking of the city. Despite the Ottoman protests and arguments, Khorramshahr was stated as a part of Iran after Farahani's firm efforts.

In May 1846, the first drafts of the treaty were written. Russia and Britain were to draw up a map of the border areas, and both parties would accept it. In the meantime, Farahani fell ill and a riot broke out in Erzurum, his house was looted and two of his companions were torn to pieces by rebels. Negotiations were suspended for several months; their continuation was subject to the punishment of the rioters and the payment of damages. The Ottoman government formally apologized to Iran, imprisoned 300 rioters and paid 15,000 tomans in compensation. Negotiations resumed and a contract including an introduction and nine articles was drafted. The Ottoman party, however, were unsatisfied with the outcome and threatened to leave the negotiations. The mediators, determined to avoid such results, continued to give the Ottomans assurances but kept the Iranians ignorant of them, hoping Mohammad Shah would endorse the new results. On 31 May 1847, Farahani and Efendi signed the treaty and left Erzurum, and on 26 June, Mohammad Shah also ratified the treaty.

While the tensions seemed to be resolved, the Ottoman government secretly added three more articles to the treaty with the support of British and Russian ambassadors. Based on these articles, Iran's rights on the Shatt al-Arab were revoked and those on Khorramshahr were reduced. Contrary to the agreements, control of Shatt al-Arab, except a few islands, was handed to the Ottoman Empire. At the end of January 1848, Mirza Javad, a courier from Tehran, arrived in Istanbul with Mohammad Shah's ratified copies of the treaty; the Ottoman government insisted they would not ratify the treaty unless the shah agreed to the new articles. Not wanting to raise Mohammad Shah's suspicion, the British and Russian ambassadors persuaded Miza Mohammad Ali Khan, Iran's envoy to France who was in Istanbul at the time, to agree to the new articles. Mirza Mohammad Ali agreed to the articles, alternatively called the "Explanatory Note", only if the ambassadors signed an official statement whereon they informed Mohammad Shah it was necessary for maintaining the treaty. Mohammad Shah did not accept the new terms and declared the treaty false and invalid. The tensions between Iran and the Ottomans persisted even after the fall of the Ottoman Empire because the newly established country Iraq inherited these disputes with Iran.

Abolition of slavery in the Persian Gulf 

In the 1840s, an estimated four-to-five-thousand slaves were sold in the Persian Gulf each year. When Justin Sheil succeeded John McNiel as the envoy to Iran in 1844, he and his wife observed the slavery and decided to act against it. He sent a letter to Aqasi and pleaded for its abolition. Mohammad Shah, however, did not respond to this diplomatic pressure so Sheil brought up the moral aspect of slavery, emphasizing its negative impacts on the African population. Mohammad Shah remained unmoved and said abolition would contradict the Islamic tradition. Sheil further argued his points but Mohammad responded such interference would undermine diplomatic relations between the two nations.

In late 1847, Sheil was recalled to London and replaced with Colonel Francis Farrant, who also negotiated for abolition with Aqasi. Farrant was more successful, especially for the newly signed treaty of Erzurum that put him a good light for the grand vizier. Farrant argued if the Ottoman Empire could abolish slavery in their nation, Iranians could do the same. The argument appealed to Aqasi, who suggested it to Mohammad Shah. Mohammad was ready to adapt the changes similar to those of the Ottomans because it is clear from the letter he sent to Farrant. In this way, he could appease the British without challenging Islamic tradition. Mohammad wrote thus to Farrant regarding the abolition of slavery in the Ottoman Empire:

Between the religions of Europe and our religion there is great distinction and difference, and we cannot observe or join in matters which are in accordance with their religion and in opposition to ours, why we wrote that the exalted English government should make enquiries of the Turkish government on this subject, was because that government being a Mahomedan state and in that country the traffic in slaves being much more extensive than any where else, we might observe what answer it will give, that then we may give a reply which should not be opposed to tenets of the Mahomedan faith.

Mohammad Shah agreed to the abolition of the slave trade through the Persian Gulf but having slaves and trading them over land was still allowed. On Mohammad's behest, Aqasi sent three letters to the governors of Fars, Kerman, and Isfahan, ordering the governors not to partake in the slave trade in the Persian Gulf and expressing his concerns of the shah's health. On the advice of both Sheil and Farrant, Aqasi also approached the major ulama of Tehran to ask their consent should the slave traders accuse them of blasphemy. The results were unfavorable; most of the ulama regarded slavers as legal according to Mohammedan law. Sheil, however, was successful in obtaining a fatwa in support of the shah's decision.

Last years and death 

Throughout his life, Mohammad Shah suffered from gout and endured recurrent attacks. He also suffered pain from the medicines given to him by his Jewish doctor, who was assigned to Mohammad when Aqasi dismissed the British and French doctors. The Jewish doctor's traditional remedies resulted to a severe paroxysm of Mohammad Shah's illness, upon which Mohammad became so weak his death was reported throughout Tehran. He recovered but lost the use of one leg. Aqasi, however, refused to let any foreign-trained physician, especially English ones, approach Mohammad; only a French doctor named Labat was allowed to treat him. Under Labat's care, Mohammad recovered somewhat but was still so feeble he could only move with the help of two persons. Becoming infirm and debilitated, Mohammad lost the will to rule; he turned the government to Aqasi, leading to political and social turmoil.

Mohammad's dire health prompted the foreign powers to reassert their pledge on the order of the succession in February 1842, and declare their support of Mohammad's eldest son Naser al-Din Mirza. Bahman Mirza, who served as regent for Naser al-Din Mirza, however, began mobilizing forces at Tabriz for a scenario in which he would pressure his nephew to become his regent in the event of Mohammad's death. Bahman Mirza had support from the Count Medem and John McNiel, the Russian and British envoys respectively, but the British withdraw their support when Shiel succeeded McNiel; and he Russians promoted Bahman Mirza as a successor to Mohammad. To counteract the Russians, in 1845, Aqasi arranged a marriage for Naser al-Din Mirza with the daughter of Ahmad Ali Mirza, a son of Fath-Ali Shah. This wedding that brought the young prince into politics. Mohammad's health slightly improved, and the realm and its succession seemed stable and secure. Rebellions, however, broke out in Khorasan, one of which Hasan Khan Salar led in support of Bahman Mirza's claim; another was led by Allah-Qoli Khan Ilkhani, a grandson of Fath-Ali Shah through his mother and a protégé of Aqasi to press his own claim. Both rebellions continued after Mohammad's death into the early years of Naser al-Din Shah.

After Mohammad ceased his role in the government, Aqasi had an increased influence on him. Aqasi, now Iran's most powerful figure, was also becoming avaricious of his position and was less inclined to govern because his mind was affected by opium. Mohammad, thinking highly of Aqasi, was happy to let him govern as he liked. In mid-to-late 1848, Mohammad suffered a combination of gout and erysipelas, from which it was clear he would not recover. 
Mohammad Shah Qajar died at around 21:00 on 4 September 1848. He was buried in Fatima Masumeh Shrine located in Qom and his tomb was placed near the shrine's sanctuary.

Policies

Religion 

In his patronage of Sufism, Mohammad Shah was compared to Ismail I. He denoted Sufi Islam as the rival of Shi'ia and the ulama. The Sufis, who were persecuted during Fath-Ali Shah's reign, could now freely promote their beliefs. Mohammad was very dependent on his Sufi teacher Aqasi and gave court positions to Aqasi's Sufi friends such as Mirza Mahdi Khui, who became chief scribe of the court. Concurrent with their new patronage, Sufis took the idea of the Hidden Imam from the Shi'ia and connected it to their Sufi saints. Figures such as Safi-ad-din Ardabili became messengers of the Hidden Imam and the Sufi murshids (spiritual guides) were the only knowledgeable people who could read these communications, often through dreaming. The Sufis despised acts of torture and violence; when Aqasi became the grand vizier, he pleaded for their reduction. Mohammad would not accept it in his early years, arguing a culprit does not deserve sympathy, but as he aged and grew weaker from gout, he ordered the complete abolition of torture.

Mohammad's approach to the Shi'ia clergy was one of hostility and conflict. He abandoned Fath-Ali Shah's attempts to reconcile the demands of piety and the tasks of the absolute ruler. He never asked for a theoretical acknowledgment of his coronation and was more inclined to search his spiritual guide in the dervishes and Sufis than in the ulama of the state. On 24 November 1842, Mohammad issued a firman abolishing the rights of sanctuary. He would constantly try to undermine the orthodox ulama position with the promotion of Sufism, and with the rise of Báb and Bábism. When Sayyid Ali Muhammad Shirazi first claimed to be the Báb (gateway to the Hidden Imam), the ulama declared a fatwa saying he must be killed. Mohammad, however, called Báb to Tehran and promised him shelter. This alarmed Aqasi, who had the Báb sent to Maku in Azerbaijan, where he was kept under confinement. Facing dissent from Mohammad, however, he took no drastic measures against the Báb and his followers.

Although Mohammad had no enmity towards any branches of Christianity, he preferred to allow the French Lazarist missionaries into Iran rather than the English Anglicans. In hope of bringing modern education to the nation, he issued an edict that allowed missionaries to open schools. The head of the Lazarists was Eugène Boré, who in 1839 opened a school in Tabriz with both Christian and Muslim students. Boré's school triggered unrest among ulama of Tabriz but under the protection of Mohammad, they could not harm Boré.

Education 
During his tenure as the governor of Azerbaijan, Abbas Mirza sent several students to France, mainly with the goal of improving the military. Mohammad Shah took his father's path and sent seven students of noble birth to Europe, among whom were Mirza Hosein Khan Moshir od-Dowleh, the future grand vizier of Naser al-Din Shah; and Mirza Malkam Khan, who put in place the basis of the Iranian Enlightenment. These students were to master skills in military, painting, medicine, and geometry. Another 10 people were to be sent to France in 1847 but it is uncertain they were sent.

In 1837, on the orders of Mohammad, Mirza Saleh Shirazi published the first Iranian newspaper in Tehran. This newspaper was untitled and was referred to as Kaghaz-e Akhbar (news-paper). It lasted only for one issue but Mirza Saleh's determination led to him publishing another newspaper called Akhbar-i Vaqa-a which became Iran's first regular newspaper. Many lithographic printing presses were established in Tehran, Urmia, Tabriz and Isfahan on the orders of Mohammad.

Administration 

As a result of various wars and the continual unrest throughout Iran, Mohammad Shah's treasury was virtually empty. In hope of improving financial conditions, he sought to revive barren fields that were burned in the wars with Russia and the local insurgencies. He asked the French foreign minister for a French irrigation expert but nothing came of it. With Mohammad's efforts, however, 1,438 villages—of these villages were part of the royal domain—were made habitable. Mohammad inherited many domain lands from Fath-Ali Shah and Agha Mohammad Khan, and he greatly increased the amount. He confiscated properties of Aqasi and through revoking the lands of Hossein Ali Mirza, gained ownership over Fars and Persian Iraq. He also confiscated properties seized by the Lutis during the Isfahan rebellion, which was disliked by major landowners. On his orders, the number of the royal domains were recorded in the Raqabat-e Mohammadshahi, which included and superseded all previous inventories.

Most of these domains were given to the villagers and the tribes who wanted a settlement. A part of Nader Shah's personal domains were returned to the Afshar tribe, who inherited the lands once the Afsharid dynasty died out. Despite granting two crores of land per person, many of these lands still belonged to the crown and under the administration of the contemporary Mostowfi ol-Mamalek, Mohammad was unable to return more of them and his successor, Naser al-Din Shah, completely ignored the Afshar's pleads and petitions. The same Mostowfi ol-Mamalek secretly extorted money and forced villagers to pay taxes.

Mohammad reinstated governmental positions that had once been part of the Safavid bureaucracy. They bore mixed results; they improved the state's efficiency but led to a corrupt administration that reached its peak in Naser al-Din Shah's reign. Positions such as Mostowfi ol-Mamalek became hereditary and many holders of these offices accepted bribery for the lack of a regular salary. Aqasi enlarged governmental titles and promoted his kinsmen so the once-rudimentary bureaucracy of Agha Mohammad Khan became filled with positions with the same duties but under different names.

Military 

Mohammad Shah continued the military reforms his father had started; these included abolishing tribal cavalry and modeling it on Frederick the Great's cavalry using Western military technology on a very small scale with Abbas Mirza's personal army of 1,000 regular infantry and 500 regular cavalry.

When Mohammad Shah ascended the throne, the Iranian army was disorganized, undisciplined and rigidly hierarchical. Mohammad could hardly muster more than 20,000 men, and those were in poor shape. Instead of carts and wagons, transportation took place by mules, camels and horses. Other than Abbas Mirza's cavalry, the army was filled with tribal cavalry who recognized only their tribal chief. To counter these problems, Mohammad Shah put forth a three-staged plan in which he would centralize the command, create arsenals, and recover from the losses suffered in the wars with Russia. He consolidated power upon himself and Aqasi to centralize the military. To create arsenals, he founded the Tehran foundry, which provided his army with 600 bronze canons, 200 mortars; and rifles, muskets and Zamburaks.

At Mohammad's request, Henry Rawlinson was sent to Kermanshah in April 1835 to train Bahram Mirza's troops in the style of Nizam-e Jadid. The Italian F. Colombari was also sent to Iran; he reformed the Zamburak units of the Iranian army with the new cannon saddles and new falconets he designed for them.

Diplomacy 
Despite his short reign, Mohammad Shah left a lasting mark on Iran's foreign policy. He had resentment towards Russia and Britain, even though both nations supported him for the succession. The weight of Russian military bordering Azerbaijan and their navy anchoring in the port of Anzali Lagoon put Mohammad Shah in a state of paranoia at the thought of another war. The Russians argued that per the Treaty of Turkmenchay they were free to anchor their ships in the Caspian Sea but neither Mohammad nor Aqasi counted Anzali as part of the sea. To keep the Russian navy away, Mohammad ordered the army of Anzali to shoot at the Russians if they approached. These events led to Nicholas I exchanging letters with Mohammad. In a diplomatic sense, Mohammad allowed the Russian navy to anchor in Anzali. Another source of tension was Russian merchants in Tabriz and Tehran who owed money to Iranians but would not pay them in full. In 1843, Mohammad issued a firman ordering full payments of the debts to prevent fraudulent bankruptcies.

During his reign, various matters disturbed Anglo-Iranian relations, the most troublesome of which was Mohammad's campaign to Herat which led the British, for the first time in their relation with Iran, to invade Iran's southern islands in the Persian Gulf. In 1841, Mohammad signed a treaty with the British ambassador under which Britain could reopen their consulates in Tehran, Tabriz and Bushehr but had to withdraw from Kharg Island. This treaty was not ideal for either side; the British did not have the right to reside outside the three cities and their goal was to establish a consulate in Gilan near the Russian border. For Mohammad, the treaty was considered shameful and a surrender to his enemy's demand. After the signing of the agreement, inexpensive British goods entered Iran through the Tabriz-Trabzon trade zone and filled the country's markets, causing the bankruptcy of a number of Iranian businessmen in Tabriz. In 1844, Iranian merchants petitioned to Mohammad to prohibit the importing of European merchandise. In the following year, traders from Kashan implored Mohammad to defend their manufacturers against European merchandise. Both cases were rejected.

Mohammad Shah was an avid Francophile and most excited to build diplomatic relations with France in lieu of Britain and Russia. As a child, Mohammad learned French from Madame de la Marininere, a tutor in the court of Abbas Mirza. He denoted French as the diplomatic language of Iran and ensured diplomats and ambassadors from other nations were fluent in French. In 1839, to resume political relations with France, Mohammad sent Mirza Hossein Khan to Paris, where Hossein Khan was brought before King of France Louis Philippe I. The Iranian delegation took with them numerous gifts, including a translation of Shahnameh and the portrait of Mohammad, which is now kept in Louvre Museum. With Mohammad's insistence, the France embassy in Iran was reopened and France–Iran relations resumed, resulting in Iran sending students to France, a tradition that continued throughout modern Iranian history.

Family 

Mohammad Shah, in comparison to other Qajar kings, had a modest harem, either from disliking sex with women or because of his severe illness. By the time he died, he had seven wives, with whom he sired four sons and five daughters. Of his consorts, a woman named Khadija was Mohammad's favourite; she bore him his best-loved son Abbas Mirza III, who was named after Mohammad's father Abbas Mirza and a deceased son of the same name. Mohammad, however, never showed fatherly affection to his son with Malek Jahan Khanom or the future king Naser al-Din. In 1839, Mohammad summoned the Naser al-Din to Tehran and treated him coldly. For most of his early childhood, Naser al-Din was no more than a nuisance for Mohammad and his grand vizier.

Mohammad Shah had seven consorts, three of whom are known:

 Malek Jahan Khanom (26 February 1805 – 2 April 1873); mother of Naser al-Din Shah and Malek Zadeh Khanum.
 Bolour Khanum Zandieh, the granddaughter of Karim Khan Zand. Mother of two daughters.
 Khadija, daughter of a Naqshbandi chief. Mother of Abbas Mirza III.
He had four sons:

 Naser al-Din Shah (16 July 1831 – 1 May 1896); Shah of Iran (r. 1848 – 1896)
 Abbas Mirza II, died in childhood.
 Abbas Mirza III (November 27, 1839 – April 13, 1897); known as Mulk Ara.
 Mohammad Taqi Mirza (d. 1901); known as Rokn ed-Dowleh, governor of several provinces.
 Abdol-samad Mirza (May 1843 – 21 October 1929); known as Ezz ed-Dowleh.

He had five daughters, four of whom are known:
 Malek Zadeh Khanum, (1834-35 – 27 June 1905); known as Ezzat ed-Dowleh, married four times, and was the grandmother of Mohammad Ali Shah.
 Ozra, daughter of Bolour Khanum Zandieh.
 Effat al-Dowleh, daughter of Bolour Khanum Zandieh.
 Aziz ol-Dowleh, married Fath-Ali Khan Saheb Divan.

Historiography and personality 

Mohammad Shah's short reign resembles an interregnum between the reigns of Fath-Ali Shah and Naser al-Din Shah. An interregnum in which, the ulama possessed little influence over the crown. Mohammad's reliance on Sufi theology and his neglect of the traditional relations with the Shi'ia ulama was the most lasting aspect of his reign and a result of the intimate relations with Aqasi. Mohammad had a passive character, was withdrawn from everyday life, and most of the time was physically unwell, he relied on Aqasi to govern while taking a ceremonial rule. The extent of Aqasi's influence over Mohammad increased in Mohammad's last years, when he became very dependent on his grand vizier; Aqasi, however, had little ability to rule, and mismanaged the economy and the military. Along with costly wars and maladministration, at the end of Mohammad's reign, Iran suffered from instability, turmoil and chaos.

Most historians present Mohammad as sedentary and aloof from governmental matters, an image that is accurate when applied to his later years. In his youth, Mohammad, though Europeanised, was a soldier like his father and his grandfather. Mohammad was contrary to the traditional appearances of Fath-Ali Shah, which included Persian ornamented long robes, high heels and a long beard, and presented a contrast in the Iranian countenance with semi-Europeanised dress and short beard. James Baillie Fraser, who met Mohammad in 1834, described him as "the worthiest of all the numerous descendants of Fath-Ali Shah, particularly in the points of moral and private character". the Comte de Sercey praised Mohammad for his political capacities; he also mentioned the inabilities of Aqasi. Mohammad was the last Qajar shah to lead his army into war. He was praised for his bravery, in particular from the contemporaneous historian Mirza Mohammad Taqi Sepehr, who wrote; “Until now, in Shiʿite realms, I never heard about a sovereign endowed with such a pure nature and so perfect manners and natural perfection. Bravery and firmness perfectly appeared in his demeanours.”

Coinage and titles 

On his seal is the text "al-Sultan ibn al-Sultan Mohammad Shah Ghazi" and on a portrait that was painted between 1836 and 1837, he is identified as "al-Sultan b. al-Sultan b. al-Sultan b. al-Sultan", an effort to legitimate his right of rule by remarking on his lineage. Mohammad used the titles "Khaqan son of Khaqan", a Turko-Mongol title; and Shahanshah, an ancient Iranian title, to follow the styles of Fath-Ali Shah, who used both Khaqan and Shahanshah.

His coins bear the inscription "Mohammad, Shahanshah-i Anbiya" (Mohammad, King of the Prophets). Mohammad Shah's coins display artistic aestheticism that is different to the coins of Fath-Ali and Naser al-Din, both of whom developed a love for glitter.

References

Notes

Citations

Bibliography 

 

 

 

 

 

 

 

Mohammad Shah
1808 births
1848 deaths
19th-century monarchs of Persia
Recipients of the Order of the White Eagle (Russia)
People from Tabriz
19th-century monarchs in the Middle East
Recipients of the Order of St. Anna, 1st class
Burials at Fatima Masumeh Shrine